Dubiecko is a town in Przemyśl County, Subcarpathian Voivodeship, in southeastern Poland. It is the seat of the gmina (administrative district) called Gmina Dubiecko.

The village has a population of 1,150.

History 

In 1389, Polish King Władysław II Jagiełło granted the royal village of Dubiecko to castellan Piotr Kmita. In 1407, King Władysław II granted town rights, while Piotr Kmita established a Catholic parish church.

As a result of the First Partition of Poland, in 1772, the town was annexed by Austria and made part of the newly formed Kingdom of Galicia and Lodomeria, within which it was administratively located in the Przemyśl county (Bezirkshauptmannschaft). Following World War I, in 1918, Poland regained independence and control of the town.

Jewish history

The town had about 1000 Jews, most of them Hassidic (ultra orthodox), and several religious Zionists.

On September 17, 1939, (On the Jewish 'Gedalya' fast day) German soldiers entered Dubiecko, two days after the slaughter of the Jews of Dynów on the second day of Rosh Hashana (September 15, 1939). They caught 11 Jews and killed them, burning the synagogues and beating the men attempting to save holy scrolls, including the Rabbis.

A week later (eve of the Succoth festivities week), on September 27 the remaining Jews were ordered to assemble at the town square. From there they were marched across the border, and the San river, while being beaten and brutalized, to Soviet territory. Some drowned during the crossing. Peasants on both sides of the river robbed the Jews of whatever little possessions they had. Some ended up in Przemyśl others in Lwów. Many perished on the way. The young Rebbe of the town perished with his wife in Przemyśl, after returning from Jerusalem to Poland just before the war. Most of the remaining Jews perished later after Operation Barbarossa in June 1941, almost two years later.

Notable people
Ignacy Krasicki (1735–1801), Polish poet, bishop, playwright, encyclopedist, Prince-Bishop of Warmia, Archbishop of Gniezno and Primate of Poland

Sports
The local football club is Pogórze Dubiecko. It competes in the lower leagues.

References

External links

Destruction of the Jewish community in the Holocaust
Jews of Dubiecko before the war
full list of info on Jews of Dubiceko

Cities and towns in Podkarpackie Voivodeship
Przemyśl County
Ruthenian Voivodeship
Kingdom of Galicia and Lodomeria
Lwów Voivodeship
Holocaust locations in Poland